Musical phrasing is the method by which a musician shapes a sequence of notes in a passage of music to allow expression, much like when speaking English a phrase may be written identically but may be spoken differently, and is named for the interpretation of small units of time known as phrases (half of a period). A musician accomplishes this by interpreting the music—from memory or sheet music—by altering tone, tempo, dynamics, articulation, inflection, and other characteristics. Phrasing can emphasise a concept in the music or a message in the lyrics, or it can digress from the composer's intention, aspects of which are commonly indicated in musical notation called phrase marks or phrase markings. For example, accelerating the tempo or prolonging a note may add tension.

Giuseppe Cambini—a composer, violinist, and music teacher of the Classical period—had this to say about bowed string instruments, specifically violin, phrasing:

Intuitive and analytical phrasing

"There are two schools of thought on phrasing," says flutist Nancy Toff: "one more intuitive, the other more analytical. The intuitive school uses a verbal model, equating the function of phrasing with that of punctuation in language. Thus, said Chopin to a student, 'He who phrases incorrectly is like a man who does not understand the language he speaks.'"

Problems linked with an analytical approach to phrasing occur particularly when the analytical approach is based only on the search for objective information, or (as is often the case) only concerned with the score:

According to Andranik Tangian,
analytical phrasing can be quite subjective, the only point is that it should follow a certain logic. For example, Webern’s Klangfarbenmelodie-styled orchestral arrangement of Ricercar from Bach’s  Musical offering demonstrates Webern’s analytical phrasing of the theme, which is quite subjective on the one hand but, on the other hand, logically consistent:

Departing from Webern’s example, Tangian proposes not only phrasing/interpretation notation but also a model of performance, where the segments are selected both intuitively and analytically and are shown by tempo envelopes, dynamics and specific instrumental techniques.

Elision or reinterpretation

In the analysis of 18th- and 19th-century Western music, an elision, overlap, or rather reinterpretation (Umdeutung), is the perception, after the fact, of a (metrically weak) cadential chord at the end of one phrase as the (metrically strong) initial chord of the next phrase. Two phrases may overlap, making the beginning and ending of both happen at the same moment in time, or both phrases and hypermeasures may overlap, making the last bar in the first hypermeasure and the first in the second. Charles Burkhart uses overlap and reinterpretation to distinguish between the overlap of phrases and of both phrase and measure-group, respectively.

See also
 Musical technique
 Tempo rubato

References

Further reading

External links
 

Music performance
Rhythm and meter